is a passenger railway station located in the city of Ōtsu, Shiga Prefecture, Japan, operated by the West Japan Railway Company (JR West).

Lines

Station layout
The station consists of one elevated island platform with the station building underneath. The station is staffed.

Platforms

Adjacent Stations

History
The station opened on 20 July 1974 as a station on the Japan National Railway (JNR). The station became part of the West Japan Railway Company on 1 April 1987 due to the privatization and dissolution of the JNR. 

Station numbering was introduced in March 2018 with Karasaki being assigned station number JR-B28.

Passenger statistics
In fiscal 2019, the station was used by an average of 3871 passengers daily (boarding passengers only).

Surrounding area
 Otsu City Hall Karasaki Branch
 Karasaki Shrine
 Otsu Municipal Karasaki Junior High School
 Otsu City Karasaki Elementary School

See also
List of railway stations in Japan

References

External links

JR West official home page

Railway stations in Japan opened in 1974
Kosei Line
Railway stations in Shiga Prefecture
Railway stations in Ōtsu